Swallows origins are obscure in terms of her launch year and place. She first appeared in 1798 as a slave ship. She first appeared in Lloyd's Register (LR) in 1798 with R.White as master, R.Abram as owner, and trade Liverpool–Africa. 

Captain Robert White acquired a letter of marque on 14 March 1798. He sailed from Liverpool on 4 May.

Swallow gathered slaves in West Africa. She escaped the French privateer Republican, of 32 guns, in a squall after an hour-long running fight. After Swallow had acquired her slaves she sailed towards the West Indies. On her way she captured a French privateer. However, the privateer's crew were able seize their captors. They then sailed Swallow and the privateer into Cayenne.

Citations

References
 

1790s ships
Age of Sail merchant ships of England
Liverpool slave ships
Captured ships